The 1880 United States House of Representatives elections in South Carolina were held on November 2, 1880 to elect five representatives Representatives for two-year terms from the state of South Carolina.  All five incumbents were re-elected and the composition of the state delegation remained solely Democratic.

1st congressional district
Incumbent Democratic Congressman John S. Richardson of the 1st congressional district, in office since 1879, defeated Republican challenger Samuel J. Lee.

General election results

|-
| 
| colspan=5 |Democratic hold
|-

2nd congressional district
Incumbent Democratic Congressman Michael P. O'Connor of the 2nd congressional district, in office since 1879, defeated Republican challenger Edmund W.M. Mackey.

General election results

|-
| 
| colspan=5 |Democratic hold
|-

3rd congressional district
Incumbent Democratic Congressman D. Wyatt Aiken of the 3rd congressional district, in office since 1877, defeated Republican challenger C.J. Stollbrand.

General election results

|-
| 
| colspan=5 |Democratic hold
|-

4th congressional district
Incumbent Democratic Congressman John H. Evins of the 4th congressional district, in office since 1877, defeated Republican challenger A. Blythe.

General election results

|-
| bgcolor="#0BDA51" |
| Greenback-Labor
| J. Hendrix McLane
| align="right" | 414
| align="right" | 1.0
| align="right" | +1.0
|-

|-
| 
| colspan=5 |Democratic hold
|-

5th congressional district
Incumbent Democratic Congressman George D. Tillman of the 5th congressional district, in office since 1879, defeated Republican challenger Robert Smalls.

General election results

|-
| 
| colspan=5 |Democratic hold
|-

See also
United States House of Representatives elections, 1880
South Carolina gubernatorial election, 1880
South Carolina's congressional districts

References
"Annual Report of the Secretary of State to the General Assembly of South Carolina." Reports and Resolutions of the General Assembly of the State of South Carolina at the Regular Session of 1880. Columbia, SC: James Woodrow, 1881, pp. 553–555.

South Carolina
1880
South Carolina